The boxing programme of the 1968 Summer Olympics in Mexico City, Mexico was held at the Arena México. Medals were awarded in eleven events, with each event corresponding to a recognized weight division of male boxers.

Medal summary

Medal table

Participating nations

Further reading

References

 
1968 Summer Olympics events
Olympics
1968